Sheikh Rashid Bin Saeed Stadium, also known as Ajman Stadium is a football stadium in Ajman. It is the home of association football club Ajman Club and has a capacity of 5,537.

References

External links
Stadium picture

Sports venues in the United Arab Emirates
Football venues in the United Arab Emirates
Multi-purpose stadiums in the United Arab Emirates
Sports venues in the Emirate of Ajman